João Sousa is the highest-ranked Portuguese tennis player by the Association of Tennis Professionals (ATP) as of February 2022. He competes on the ATP Tour, where he has won four singles titles from a total of eleven finals.

A professional player since 2005, Sousa peaked at number 61 in the world junior ranking in 2007, shortly after entering the main draw of the Orange Bowl. In June 2009, he won his first singles tournament, a Futures in Spain. Sousa started playing in the ATP Challenger Tour in 2008, winning his first tournament at this level in June 2011. Sousa debuted in the World Tour in 2008, playing that year's Estoril Open as a qualifier, and won his first top-tier ATP singles title in September 2013, at the Malaysian Open. He has participated in all four Grand Slams, having three third-round appearances at the US Open (2013) and Australian Open (2015 and 2016) as his best performances. While focusing on his singles career, Sousa has also competed in doubles; his best record is the quarterfinals of the 2015 US Open.

Sousa holds several Portuguese men's tennis records. In October 2013, he became the first player to break into the ATP singles ranking top 50, and in 2015, he secured a year-end top-50 ranking (no. 33) for the second time in his career, with 38 wins. In 2014, Sousa was the first Portuguese to play exclusively on the ATP World Tour in a single season, and the first to be seeded in a Grand Slam main draw (2014 US Open). He was the fourth Portuguese player to reach the singles top 100, and the second to do it in both singles and doubles rankings (after Nuno Marques). Sousa is also the Portuguese tennis player with the largest career prize money ever and most wins at Grand Slam singles tournaments.

Performance timelines

Singles

Current through the 2022 Miami Open.

Doubles

Significant finals

Masters 1000 finals

Doubles: 1 (1 runner-up)

ATP Career finals

Singles: 12 (4 titles, 8 runners-up)

Doubles: 1 (1 runner-up)

ATP Challenger and ITF Futures finals

Singles: 20 (12–8)

Doubles: 14 (11–3)

Grand Slam singles seedings

Head-to-head against top 10 players
This section contains Sousa's win-loss record against players who have been ranked 10th or higher in the world rankings during their careers.

Wins over top 10 players

Singles
Sousa has a  record against players who were, at the time the match was played, ranked in the top 10.

Doubles
Sousa has a  record against players who were, at the time the match was played, ranked in the top 10.

Career earnings

National participation

Davis Cup (37 wins, 26 losses)
Sousa debuted for the Portugal Davis Cup team in the 2008 season and has played 52 matches in 25 ties. His singles record is 23–12 and his doubles record is 8–9 (31–21 overall).

   indicates the result of the Davis Cup match followed by the score, date, place of event, the zonal classification and its phase, and the court surface.

Notes

References
General sources
Information about career finals and earnings, Grand Slam seedings, singles and doubles performance timelines, head-to-head records against top-20 players, and national team participation have been taken from these sources:

 
 
 
 
 
 
 
 
 
 
 
 
 
 
 
 
 
 
 
 
 
 
 
 

Citations

Tennis career statistics